Haji Ahmad Sidi Ismail is a Malaysian politician and was the member of Terengganu State Legislative Assembly for Telemung constituency in Terengganu from 1974 to 1995, sitting as a member of the United Malays National Organisation (UMNO) party in the ruling Barisan Nasional coalition. He declined to seek re-election in 1995 even though he was invited to be the next Member of Parliament candidate for Hulu Terengganu under UMNO.

Election results

Awards 
  :
 Officer of the Order of the Defender of the Realm (KMN) (1978)
  :
  Knight Commander of the Order of the Crown of Terengganu (DPMT) – Dato' (1983)
 Distinguished Service Medal (PJC) (1986)
  Member Knight Companion of the Order of Sultan Mahmud I of Terengganu (DSMT) – Dato' (1992)

See also

 Telemung (state constituency)
 Alias Ali

References 

Knights Commander of the Order of the Crown of Terengganu
Officers of the Order of the Defender of the Realm
Members of the Terengganu State Legislative Assembly
United Malays National Organisation politicians
Living people
People from Terengganu
Malaysian people of Malay descent
Malaysian Muslims
1942 births